Queer Britain is a museum of British LGBTQ history and culture located in Kings Cross, London. It is the first dedicated LGBTQ museum in the UK.  The museum consists of three connected galleries plus a shop and occupies the ground floor of 2 Granary Square, a building owned by the Art Fund, with office and studio space on lower ground. Admission is free.

History

Queer Britain was founded in February 2018 by Joseph Galliano, a former editor of Gay Times, and Ian Mehrtens. It was registered as a charity in September 2019.

Exhibitions

Prior to gaining its own location, Queer Britain staged occasional exhibitions in temporary locations. In 2018 it staged an exhibition Our Naked Skin in collaboration with the Salisbury Arts Centre including a filmed oral history project, Virtually Queer. In summer 2019 it staged an exhibition on Chosen Family in Mercer Street Showrooms, Covent Garden.

Queer Britain opened as a physical museum on May 5, 2022, in advance of the 50th anniversary of Britain's first gay pride march. The introductory display, Welcome to Queer Britain, consisted of material from the museum's photography archive. The first full exhibition, We Are Queer Britain, occupying all three galleries, opened in July. The exhibition won Best Small Museum Project 2022, awarded by The Museums Association as part of their Museums Change Lives campaign. When not on display, the museum's collection is housed at the Bishopsgate Institute.

See also 

 List of museums in London
 Schwules Museum

References

External links 
 
 ‘This is for everyone!’: inside Britain’s first ever LGBTQ+ museum (Owen Jones for The Guardian)
 Why the UK Needs a LGBTQ+ Museum (Interview with Joseph Galliano by Sophie Willkinson for Vice)

2018 establishments in the United Kingdom
Museums established in 2022
Museums in London
LGBT museums and archives
Sexuality in the United Kingdom
LGBT history in the United Kingdom
LGBT culture in the United Kingdom
Kings Cross, London
Charities based in London